Utetheisa disrupta is a moth in the family Erebidae. It was described by Arthur Gardiner Butler in 1887. It is found in the Philippines (Negros), on the Caroline Islands, Sumatra, the Natuna Islands, Sulawesi, the Moluccas, Irian Jaya, New Guinea, the Solomon Islands and in Micronesia (Angal).

Subspecies
Utetheisa disrupta disrupta
Utetheisa disrupta burica (Holland, 1900)

References

Moths described in 1887
disrupta